Biridašwa (Sanskrit: "Prītāśva," "whose horse is dear" (Mayrhofer II 182)) was a mayor of Aštartu, (Tell-Ashtara), south of Damascus, (named Dimasqu/Dimašqu),  during the time of the Amarna letters correspondence, about 1350–1335 BC. A second mayor of Aštartu, Ayyab, existed in this short 15–20 year time period.

History
Though Biridašwa did not communicate with the Egyptian pharaoh directly in any of the Amarna letters, he, along with the mayors of Busruna and Halunnu were involved with the intrigues of city/city-state takeovers, in the region of Damascus. The region around Dimašqu was named Upu, or Apu, a name going back to at least pharaoh Thutmose III's time, (1479-1425 BC).

Biridašwa of EA letters 196, and EA 197
Biryawaza the king of Dimašqu wrote 4 letters addressed to pharaoh, and letters 3 and 4 are about Biridašwa.

Letter no. 197: title: "Biryawaza's plight"
Biryawaza letter no. 4 of 4:
"[...  ...he] said t[o me when] your servant was in A[dura, ...They gave] his horses and hi[s] chariots to the 'Apiru, and they did not [give them] to the king, my lord. And who am I? My (only) purpose is to be a servant. Everything belongs to the king. Biridašwa saw this deed and moved Yanuamma to rebellion against me. Having barred the city gate against me, he took chariots from Aštartu but gave both of them to the 'Apiru and did not give both of them to the king, my lord. When the king of Busruna and the king of Halunnu saw (i.e. saw this), they waged war with Biridašwa against me, constantly saying, "Come, let's kill Biryawaza-(i.e. 'of Damascus'), and we must not let him go to [...] ...." But, I got away from them and stayed in [...]–Dimašqa, for [by myself h]ow can I serv[e the king, my lord]? [They] keep saying, "[We are servants of the king of Hatti," and I keep saying, "I am a servant of the king of Egyp[t]-(named Mizri)." Arsawuya went to Ki[ssa]-(Qidšu/Kadesh), took (some of) Aziru's troops, and captured Šaddu. He gave it to the 'Apiru and did not give it to the king, my lord. Now, since Itatkama (Etakkama), has caused the loss of the land of Kissa, and since Arsawuya along with Biridašwa is causing the loss of Apu-(i.e. the "region" surrounding Damascus), may the king look carefully to his land lest the enemies take it. Since my brothers are at war with me, I am guarding Kumidu, the city of the king, my lord. May the king indeed be at one with his servant. [M]ay the king [not] abandon his servant, [and may] the kings of [... (and) the ki]ngs of Apu see whe[ther ...]  ... I have seen the archers.  -EA 197, lines 1-42 (~~complete, with lacunae)

Letter EA 197-(EA for 'el Amarna'), is the only reference to the locality/capture of:  Šaddu. Also the only reference to city Yanuamma.

Letter no. 196: title: "Unheard-of deeds"
Biryawaza's letter 196, is a heavily reconstructed letter with "6 lines of 43", a lacuna. The ending is mostly complete and has the referencing to Biridašwa.

Biryawaza letter no. 3 of 4:
"...Moreover, may the king, [my] lord, send me 200–men to guard ((to guard))-(-emphasis?), the cities of the king, [my] lord, [un]til [I] see the archers [of the king], my lord. The king, my lord, must not negle[ct] this deed that Biridašwa [has] committed, for he has moved the land of [the king], my lord, and [his] cities to rebellion."'  -EA 196 (only lines 33-43(End))

See also
Biryawaza
Aram Damascus
Upu

References
Moran, William L. The Amarna Letters.'' Johns Hopkins University Press, 1987, 1992. (softcover)

Amarna letters officials
Canaanite people
14th-century BC rulers
14th-century BC people